Nadine Dobrovolskaïa-Zavadskaïa (in Kiev, Russian Empire – 31 October 1954 in Milan, Italy) was a Russian Empire and French researcher, surgeon and geneticist. She was likely born in Kiev, studied in Saint Petersburg and was the first woman to become professor of surgery in the Russian Empire in 1918. Later she took part in Russian Civil War and fled to Egypt just to find second home in Paris. There she made a genetic and oncology research career discovering Brachyury gene in mice. Also she established RIII mouse strain which helped to discover MMTV retrovirus.

Biography 
Nadiya Dobrovolska may have been born in Kyiv, or according to other sources, was born in Kozyatyn, Berdychiv County, Kyiv Province. Her father was Alex F. Dobrovolsky, and her mother was Tatiana Miheyivna. She graduated from Fundukleiv Women's Gymnasium.

She then entered the Women's Medical Institute, where she studied from 1899 to 1904 and received a medical education as a surgeon. While studying, she also worked from 1902-1904  as an intern in the clinic of Professor Maksim Subbotin. After graduating from the institute she worked as a doctor in Vyatka province. In 1907, Nadezhda Dobrovolska was appointed assistant professor and later, associate professor of operative surgery at the Women's Medical Institute. In 1911 she received a doctorate in medicine. Starting in 1914, she was a part-time doctor at the Obukhiv Hospital in Petrograd.

Later she worked as a professor at St. George's University (now the University of Tartu, Estonia ). Dobrovolska-Zavadskaya became the head of the department of surgery at the University in Voronezh from 1920-1921.

According to other sources, during the civil war in Russia, she found herself in the ranks of the medical service of the "White Guard" , with which she retreated in 1920 to the Crimea. From there she emigrated on the steamer "Romania" through Turkey to Egypt, where she was in a camp for refugees from Russia near the town of Tel el-Kebir. In 1921, she went to Paris.

References 

Scientists from Kyiv
1878 births
1954 deaths
Physicians from Kyiv
Emigrants from the Russian Empire to France
Surgeons from the Russian Empire
French surgeons
Women surgeons
Geneticists from the Russian Empire
French geneticists
Women geneticists
Cancer researchers